Curtis Dickson (born July 18, 1988) is a Canadian professional lacrosse player who currently plays for the San Diego Seals of the National Lacrosse League. Prior to signing with the Seals in August 2022, he played 11 seasons with the Calgary Roughnecks. He has also played for the Chaos Lacrosse Club in the Premier Lacrosse League and Denver Outlaws and New York Lizards in the MLL.

He was a two-time All-American lacrosse player at University of Delaware from 2007 to 2010, where he served as captain of the 2010 NCAA Tournament Blue Hens team and was a member of the only Final Four team in school history.

Lacrosse career
Dickson grew up in Port Coquitlam, British Columbia and honed his lacrosse skills in the Western Lacrosse Association and BC Junior A Lacrosse Leagues, on teams such as the New Westminster Salmonbellies and the Maple Ridge Burrards.

In 2007, during Delaware's Final Four run, Dickson contributed seven goals and one assist in that year's NCAA Tournament. Dickson is among the top 20 all-time in single-season goals scored and career goals scored. He completed his college career as the fourth leading scorer and all-time Delaware leader in goals, with 62 goals and 15 assists his senior season. He was a finalist for the Tewaaraton Trophy player of the year award in 2010.

In 2011, he won the NLL Rookie Of The Year Award.

Heading into the 2023 NLL season, Inside Lacrosse ranked Dickson the #8 best forward in the NLL.

Statistics

University of Delaware

MLL

NLL

PLL Statistics

OLA/WLA/MSL Statistics

See also
Delaware Fighting Blue Hens men's lacrosse

References

External links
 NLL Bio

Awards

1988 births
Living people
Calgary Roughnecks players
Canadian expatriate lacrosse people in the United States
Canadian lacrosse players
Delaware Fightin' Blue Hens men's lacrosse players
Lacrosse forwards
People from Port Coquitlam
Lacrosse people from British Columbia